In graph theory, the cube-connected cycles is an undirected cubic graph, formed by replacing each vertex of a hypercube graph by a cycle.

Definition 
The cube-connected cycles  of order n (denoted CCCn) can be defined as a graph formed from a set of n2n nodes, indexed by pairs of numbers (x, y) where 0 ≤ x < 2n and 0 ≤ y < n.

This graph can also be interpreted as the result of replacing each vertex of an n-dimensional hypercube graph by an n-vertex cycle. The hypercube graph vertices are indexed by the numbers x, and the positions within each cycle by the numbers y.

Properties 

The cube-connected cycles  of order n is the Cayley graph of a 
group that acts on binary words of length n by rotation and flipping bits of the word. The generators used to form this Cayley graph from the group are the group elements that act by rotating the word one position left, rotating it one position right, or flipping its first bit. Because it is a Cayley graph, it is vertex-transitive: there is a symmetry of the graph mapping any vertex to any other vertex.

According to the Lovász conjecture, the cube-connected cycle graph should always contain a Hamiltonian cycle, and this is now known to be true. More generally, although these graphs are not pancyclic, they contain cycles of all but a bounded number of possible even lengths, and when n is odd they also contain many of the possible odd lengths of cycles.

Parallel processing application 

In this application, cube-connected cycles have the connectivity advantages of hypercubes while only requiring three connections per processor. Preparata and Vuillemin showed that a planar layout based on this network has optimal area × time2 complexity for many parallel processing tasks.

Notes

References
.
.
.
.
.
.

Network topology
Parametric families of graphs
Regular graphs